Seneca Williams Mill is a historic building located just outside of Maquoketa, Iowa, United States.  Originally known as Oakland Mill, it was built by Joseph Willey in 1867.  The 2½-story stone building has a partial basement and is capped with a gable roof.  A water-powered turbine, still extant, supplied the power to operate the mill.  The location of the mill race can still be seen on the east side of the property, and permanents of the damn remain in Prairie Creek.  None of the mill workings remain on the inside.  Willey sold the mill to Seneca Williams in 1867, and he operated in until 1904.  The building was converted into a barn in 1920.  The building was listed on the National Register of Historic Places in 1976.  Wildlife artist Patrick J. Costello used the old mill as a residence and studio from 1979 to 2006.  His daughter Tracy Costello Taylor has operated it since as a reception hall.

References

Industrial buildings completed in 1867
Buildings and structures in Jackson County, Iowa
National Register of Historic Places in Jackson County, Iowa
Grinding mills on the National Register of Historic Places in Iowa
Flour mills in the United States
Grinding mills in Iowa
Vernacular architecture in Iowa
1867 establishments in Iowa